Tony Okechukwu Nwoye (born 13 September 1974) is a Nigerian politician, a former member of the Nigerian House of Representatives representing the people of Anambra East/West constituency of Anambra state. A former Governorship candidate of the People's Democratic Party, PDP, in the 2013 Anambra State gubernatorial election and was also a gubernatorial candidate of the APC in the 2017 Anambra State gubernatorial election. He is currently a member of the Labour Party.

Background

Nwoye was born to the family of chief and Mrs. Lawrence Nwoye of Offianta Nsugbe on 13 September 1974. He went to Metropolitan Secondary School, Onitsha for his secondary education from where he proceeded to study medicine in the University of Nigeria college of medicine and later furthered his knowledge of medicine at the Ebonyi state University and sworn in as a medical doctor.

Political career

Nwoye started his political career as medical student where he functioned in different capacity as a leader. He was noted to having fought for student unionism. later became the first medical student to become the speaker of the student union house of representative in the university of Nigeria.
He received an award from the then Vice Chancellor, Prof Ginigeme Mbanefo, for the role he played in fighting cultism in the school.
He arose to state power as Assistant Secretary of the Executive Committee of the Anambra State PDP in 2005 and by 2006 at the age of 31, he became the Chairman of the State Executive Committee of the Anambra State PDP making him the youngest State Chairman of a major political party in the entire nation. In 2014 he unsuccessfully contested for Anambra State election under PDP. In 2015, he won a case at the Election Tribunal over the APGA (All Progressive Grand Alliance) candidate, Peter Madubueze, to become the representative for Anambra East and West in the Federal House of Representatives. In 2016, Nwoye left PDP and joined APC (All Progressives Congress).

Business

He is the founder and non executive Director of Vintage Consolidated Ltd.

References

External links 
http://www.vanguardngr.com/2016/05/nwoye-dumps-pdp-apc-empowers-constituents/
https://www.informationng.com/tag/tony-nwoye
https://totalmandategg.wordpress.com/2013/10/25/the-man-tony-nwoye-the-next-governor-of-anambra-state/
http://nigerianpilot.com/anambra-politics-new-gladiators-apc-emerge/
http://www.herald.ng/why-ndigbo-are-leaving-pdp-for-apc-nwoye/

1958 births
Living people
People from Onitsha
University of Nigeria alumni